Tubulointerstitial nephritis antigen is a protein that in humans is encoded by the TINAG gene.

TINAG is a basement membrane glycoprotein initially identified as a target of antibodies in some forms of immunologically mediated tubulointerstitial nephritis.[supplied by OMIM]

References

Further reading